The presidential memorials in the United States honor presidents of the United States and seek to showcase and perpetuate their legacies.

Living and physical elements
A presidential memorial may have a physical element which consists of a monument, a statue within a monument, a historical home, a presidential library, and other sites whose entire presence consists of a physical structure that is a permanent remembrance of the president it represents.  Most well-known presidential memorials, such as the Washington, Lincoln and Jefferson memorials, have a physical element.

There are also official presidential memorials that have a living element with only a minor physical presence. An example of a presidential living memorial is the Woodrow Wilson International Center for Scholars. Located in a wing of the Ronald Reagan Building in Washington, D.C., the Wilson Center has a small exhibit concerning President Wilson's life and work, but it is best known for its work to unite the world of ideas with the world of policy by supporting scholarship linked to issues of contemporary importance.  In this way the living memorial perpetuates President Wilson's legacy of scholarship linked closely to international relations.

Similarly, the Harry S. Truman Scholarship honors U.S. college students dedicated to public service and policy leadership, and thus may be considered a memorial with solely a living element. The Truman Scholarship is the sole federal memorial allowed to honor President Truman.

This can also be accomplished through the establishment of a policy institute, like the Eisenhower Institute whose mandate is to advance Eisenhower's intellectual and leadership legacies through research, public education, and public policy recommendations.

The James Madison Memorial Building, the third and newest building of the Library of Congress, is an example of a memorial with both living and physical elements. The building houses a memorial hall to President James Madison, but is also dedicated in memory of his 1783 proposal that the Continental Congress form an official library.

Existing presidential memorials
Multiple statues, homes, and other physical memorials to some presidents exist, only large structures are mentioned below:
 Washington Monument
 Washington Monument (Baltimore)
 Washington Monument (Washington County)
 George Washington Masonic National Memorial
 Washington boyhood home
 George Washington's Mount Vernon
 Washington presidential library 
 Adams National Historical Park
Peacefield
John Adams Birthplace
John Quincy Adams Birthplace
 John Adams Building
 Jefferson Memorial
 Thomas Jefferson Building
 Thomas Jefferson's Monticello
 James Madison's Montpelier
 James Madison Memorial Building
 James Monroe Museum and Memorial Library
 James Monroe's Highland
 Andrew Jackson Statue, Lafayette Square, Washington, D.C.
 Andrew Jackson's The Hermitage
 Martin Van Buren National Historic Site
 William Henry Harrison's Grouseland
 James K. Polk Home
 President James K. Polk Historic Site
 Millard Fillmore House
 Franklin Pierce Homestead
 James Buchanan Memorial in Meridian Hill Park, Washington, DC
 President James Buchanan's Wheatland 
 Lincoln Memorial
 Abraham Lincoln Birthplace National Historical Park
 Lincoln Boyhood National Memorial
 Lincoln's New Salem State Historic Site
 Lincoln Home National Historic Site
 Ford's Theatre National Historic Site
 Lincoln Tomb and War Memorials State Historic Site
 Abraham Lincoln Presidential Library and Museum
 President Andrew Johnson Museum and Library
 Andrew Johnson National Historic Site
 Ulysses S. Grant Memorial
 General Grant National Memorial
 Rutherford B. Hayes House
 Rutherford B. Hayes Presidential Library and Museum
 James A. Garfield Memorial
 James A. Garfield Monument
 James A. Garfield National Historic Site
 Grover Cleveland Birthplace
 Benjamin Harrison memorial statue 
 Benjamin Harrison Presidential Site
 McKinley National Memorial
 National McKinley Birthplace Memorial
 William McKinley Monument
 Theodore Roosevelt Birthplace National Historic Site
 Theodore Roosevelt Inaugural National Historic Site
 Sagamore Hill National Historic Site
 Theodore Roosevelt National Park
 Theodore Roosevelt's Maltese Cross Cabin
 Pine Knot cabin
 Theodore Roosevelt Island
 Theodore Roosevelt Monument
 William Howard Taft National Historic Site
 Woodrow Wilson Boyhood Home
 Woodrow Wilson House (Washington, D.C.)
 Woodrow Wilson Presidential Library
 Woodrow Wilson International Center for Scholars
 Harding Home
 Warren G. Harding Memorial (Marion Cemetery)
 Coolidge Homestead
 Calvin Coolidge House
 Calvin Coolidge Presidential Library and Museum
 Hoover Tower
 Herbert Hoover Presidential Library and Museum
 Home of Franklin D. Roosevelt National Historic Site
 Franklin D. Roosevelt Presidential Library and Museum
 Franklin Delano Roosevelt Memorial
 Franklin D. Roosevelt Four Freedoms Park, New York City's Roosevelt Island
 Harry S. Truman National Historic Site
 Harry S. Truman Presidential Library and Museum
 Harry S. Truman Scholarship
 Eisenhower National Historic Site
 Dwight D. Eisenhower Presidential Library, Museum and Boyhood Home
 Dwight D. Eisenhower Memorial
 John F. Kennedy National Historic Site
 John F. Kennedy Eternal Flame
 John F. Kennedy Memorial (Dallas)
 John F. Kennedy Presidential Library and Museum
 Lyndon B. Johnson National Historical Park
 Lyndon B. Johnson State Park and Historic Site
 Lyndon Baines Johnson Memorial Grove on the Potomac
 Lyndon B. Johnson Presidential Library and Museum
 Richard Nixon Presidential Library and Museum
Birthplace and childhood home
 Gerald R. Ford Presidential Library
 Gerald R. Ford Presidential Museum
 Jimmy Carter National Historic Site
 Jimmy Carter Presidential Library and Museum
 Ronald Reagan Presidential Library and Museum
 Ronald Reagan Building
 George Bush Presidential Library and Museum
 President William Jefferson Clinton Birthplace Home National Historic Site
 William J. Clinton Presidential Center and Park
 George W. Bush Presidential Center
 Mount Rushmore National Memorial

See also
List of buildings and monuments honoring presidents of the United States in other countries
List of national memorials of the United States
List of memorials to George Washington
List of places named for Thomas Jefferson
List of places named for James Monroe
List of places named for Andrew Jackson
List of memorials to William Henry Harrison
List of memorials to John Tyler
List of places named for James K. Polk
List of memorials to Theodore Roosevelt
List of things named after Ronald Reagan
List of things named after George H. W. Bush
List of things named after Bill Clinton
List of things named after Barack Obama
List of things named after Donald Trump
 National Historic Landmark
 National Register of Historic Places
List of residences of presidents of the United States
List of burial places of presidents and vice presidents of the United States
 List of educational institutions named after presidents
 List of sculptures of presidents of the United States
 Presidential library system

References 

National Memorials of the United States